Frou Frou, Frou-Frou, or Fru Fru may refer to:

Fictional characters
Le Comte de Frou Frou, a minor Blackadder character
Frou-Frou, the horse in Disney's The Aristocats
Frou-Frou, Vronsky's steeplechase mare in Anna Karenina
Fru Fru, an arctic shrew from the Disney animated film Zootopia
Furu Furu, a character in the anime series Majokko Megu-chan whose name is spelled "Fru Fru" in Italian translations

Music
Frou Frou (band)
"Fru Fru", a song on Free Again (Gene Ammons album)

Other  uses
Frou-Frou (1923), a film directed by Guy du Fresnay 
Frou-Frou (1955), a French comedy directed by Augusto Genina
Frou-Frou (play), adaptation of 1869 French comedy
Miss Fru Fru, an episode of the Cartoon Network animated series, Camp Lazlo
 Le Frou-frou, a weekly satirical journal published in Paris from 1900 to 1923

See also
Little Bunny Foo Foo